Bethan is a village development committee in Ramechhap District in the Janakpur Zone of north-eastern Nepal. At the time of the 1991 Nepal census it had a population of 5,305 people living in 944 individual households.

Notable Person
 Kul Man Ghising, Director of NEA

References

External links
UN map of the municipalities of Ramechhap District

Populated places in Ramechhap District